Evangelical Lutheran Church can refer to many different Lutheran churches in the world. Among them are the following:

U.S.
 Evangelical Lutheran Church in America, a mainline Protestant denomination in Chicago, Illinois
 Evangelical Lutheran Church (United States), 1917–1960
 Evangelical Lutheran Church (Frederick, Maryland)

Germany
 Evangelical Lutheran Free Church (Germany)
 Evangelical Lutheran Church in Bavaria
 Evangelical Lutheran Church in Brunswick
 Evangelical-Lutheran Church of Hanover
 Evangelical Lutheran Church of Mecklenburg
 Evangelical Lutheran Church in Northern Germany
 Evangelical Lutheran Church in Oldenburg
 Evangelical-Lutheran Church of Saxony
 Evangelical Lutheran Church of Schaumburg-Lippe
 Evangelical Lutheran Church in Thuringia
 Evangelical-Lutheran Church in Württemberg
 Independent Evangelical-Lutheran Church
 North Elbian Evangelical Lutheran Church

Europe
 Church of Denmark, Evangelical Lutheran Church in Denmark
 Evangelical Lutheran Church of England
 Estonian Evangelical Lutheran Church
 Evangelical Lutheran Church of Finland
 Evangelical Lutheran Church in France
 Evangelical Lutheran Church – Synod of France and Belgium
 Church of Iceland, Evangelical Lutheran Church of Iceland
 Evangelical Lutheran Church of Latvia (present also outside Europe)
 Latvian Evangelical Lutheran Church Abroad
 Evangelical Lutheran Church in Lithuania
 Evangelical Lutheran Church in the Republic of Moldova
 Evangelical Lutheran Church in the Kingdom of the Netherlands
 Church of Norway, Evangelical Lutheran Church of Norway
 Evangelical Lutheran Church in Russia and Other States
 Evangelical Lutheran Church of Ingria
 Evangelical Lutheran Church of the Augsburg Confession, Kisač, Serbia
 Church of Sweden

South America
 Evangelical Lutheran Church of Argentina
 Evangelical Lutheran Church of Brazil
 Evangelical Lutheran Church in Chile
 Evangelical Lutheran Church of Colombia
 Evangelical Lutheran Church in Ecuador
 Evangelical Lutheran Church in Suriname
 Evangelical Lutheran Church in Venezuela

Elsewhere

Evangelical Lutheran Church in Australia, merged to form the Lutheran Church of Australia
United Evangelical Lutheran Church of Australia, merged to form the Lutheran Church of Australia
 Evangelical Lutheran Church in Canada
 Church of the Faroe Islands
 Evangelical Lutheran Church of Ghana
 Evangelical Lutheran Church in Guyana
 Evangelical Lutheran Church of Hong Kong
 Andhra Evangelical Lutheran Church in Andhra Pradesh, India
 Tamil Evangelical Lutheran Church, Tamil Nadu, India
 Evangelical Lutheran Church in Jordan and the Holy Land
 Evangelical Lutheran Church of Papua New Guinea
 Evangelical Lutheran Church in Southern Africa
 Evangelical Lutheran Church in Tanzania

See also
 Evangelisch-lutherische Kirche (disambiguation)